Sheikh Mohamad Osseiran is the Jaafari mufti of Saida and Zahrani districts of South Lebanon, Lebanon. Osseiran is a Muslim Lebanese cleric who engages in interfaith dialogue.

References

Living people
Lebanese Shia Muslims
Lebanese Muslims
Lebanese Shia clerics
Lebanese politicians
Osseiran family
Year of birth missing (living people)
People from Sidon